Waterford is a census-designated place (CDP) comprising the primary village in the town of Waterford, New London County, Connecticut, United States. It is in the southeast part of the town, bordered to the east by the city of New London. U.S. Route 1 (Boston Post Road) passes east–west through the community. As of the 2010 census, the CDP had a population of 2,887, out of 19,517 in the entire town of Waterford.

References 

Census-designated places in New London County, Connecticut
Census-designated places in Connecticut